Garden City is a city in Ada County, Idaho. The population was 12,316 at the time of the 2020 census. Garden City is nearly surrounded by Boise but retains a separate municipal government.

Garden City was named for gardens raised by Chinese immigrants who lived in the area. The name of the city's only main street, Chinden Boulevard, is a portmanteau of the words "China" and "garden." In the second decade of the 21st century, it became a haven for artists' studios.

Garden City is part of the Boise metropolitan area.

Geography
Garden City is located at  (43.645561, -116.266132), at an elevation of 2674 feet (815 m) above sea level.

Demographics

2010 census
At the 2010 census there were 10,972 people, 4,878 households, and 2,849 families living in the city. The racial makeup of the city was 86.2% White, 1.0% African American, 1.1% Native American, 1.4% Asian, 0.1% Pacific Islander, 7.1% from other races, and 3.1% from two or more races. Hispanic or Latino of any race were 13.8%.

Of the 4,878 households 24.6% had children under the age of 18 living with them, 42.3% were married couples living together, 11.2% had a female householder with no husband present, 4.9% had a male householder with no wife present, and 41.6% were non-families. 34.0% of households were one person and 14.5% were one person aged 65 or older. The average household size was 2.22 and the average family size was 2.81.

The median age was 43.2 years. 20.6% of residents were under the age of 18; 8.9% were between the ages of 18 and 24; 22.3% were from 25 to 44; 29.2% were from 45 to 64; and 18.8% were 65 or older. The gender makeup of the city was 48.4% male and 51.6% female.

2000 census
At the 2000 census there were 10,624 people, 4,331 households, and 2,784 families living in the city. The population density was 2,559.9 per square mile. There were 4,590 housing units at an average density of 1,106.0 per square mile. The racial makeup of the city was 89.3% White, 0.5% African American, 0.9% Native American, 1.4% Asian, 0.1% Pacific Islander, 4.9% from other races, and 2.9% from two or more races. Hispanic or Latino of any race were 9.6%.

Of the 4,331 households 29.8% had children under the age of 18 living with them, 47.7% were married couples living together, 10.9% had a female householder with no husband present, and 35.7% were non-families. 27% of households were one person and 8.3% were one person aged 65 or older. The average household size was 2.43 and the average family size was 2.91.

The age distribution was 24.3% under the age of 18, 10.8% from 18 to 24, 29.9% from 25 to 44, 22.6% from 45 to 64, and 12.5% 65 or older. The median age was 35 years. For every 100 females, there were 103.1 males. For every 100 females age 18 and over, there were 101.3 males.

The median household income was $38,520 and the median family income was $46,463. Males had a median income of $30,499 versus $28,315 for females. The per capita income for the city was $24,242. About 9.8% of families and 12.7% of the population were below the poverty line, including 16.6% of those under age 18 and 4.0% of those age 65 or over.

Education
Most of Garden City is in Boise School District. A portion is in the West Ada School District (Meridian Joint School District 2).

The Boise School District portion is zoned as follows:
 Elementary schools: Madison/Whittier, Mountain View, Pierce Park, Shadow Hills
 Part in North Middle School, part in Riverglen Middle School
 Part in Boise High School, part in Capital High School

See also

 List of cities in Idaho
 Surel's Place – an artist in residency program located in Garden City

References

External links

 

Chinese-American culture in Idaho
Cities in Idaho
Cities in Ada County, Idaho
Boise metropolitan area